Hydriomena magnificata, the magnificent highflier, is a species of geometrid moth in the family Geometridae. It is found in North America.

The MONA or Hodges number for Hydriomena magnificata is 7270.

References

Further reading

 
 

Hydriomena